Banyun may refer to:
Bainuk people, of Senegal
Banyun, Iran (disambiguation)